Gerald Mark David Woodworth  (1939 - 1994) was an Anglican priest in Ireland.

Woodworth was educated at Trinity College, Dublin and the Church of Ireland Theological College; and ordained in 1965. After curacies in Dublin he held incumbencies  at Kilkenny then Bandon. He was Archdeacon and Dean of Cashel from 1984 until his death in 1994. Woodworth was instrumental to the conservation of the Bolton Library.

References

1939 births
1994 deaths
Alumni of Trinity College Dublin
Alumni of the Church of Ireland Theological Institute
Archdeacons of Cashel, Waterford and Lismore
Deans of Cashel
20th-century Irish Anglican priests